Buckhall, Virginia is an unincorporated community in the census-designated place (CDP) of the same name, in Prince William County, Virginia. Its population of was 20,420 as of the 2020 Census.

Demographics

As of the 2020 census, there where 20,420 people and 5,353 households.

Origins

It is where the remnants of the  original small town are now, that Buckhall School (formerly Oak Hill School) a one-room school house, was built in 1865, around which the village then grew up.

Adjacent to the site of the school, a general store was built, which was gutted by a fire on August 21, 2007.  By October 2008, however, refurbishment of the Buckhall store had been completed, and it re-opened under new management.

The Buckhall Church (now Buckhall United Methodist Church) was built (ca. 1905) nearby, beside what is now Prince William Parkway, and still stands as of 2015. An addition was added onto the original church in 1988, and an even larger addition was completed in April 2007, while still preserving and retaining the older, historic Civil War era church building structure.

Buckhall Fire Dept.

The Buckhall Volunteer Fire Department (County Fire Station #516) is located on Yates Ford Drive just off the Prince William Parkway.

Major highways

 (Dumfries Road)

 (Prince William County Parkway)
connects to  Virginia State Route 28 (Centerville Road) one mile north of Buckhall, and to  Interstate 95 eleven miles south of Buckhall.

References

Census-designated places in Prince William County, Virginia
Washington metropolitan area
Unincorporated communities in Virginia
Census-designated places in Virginia
Unincorporated communities in Prince William County, Virginia